Beskid Dukielski (Dukla Beskid) is the middle part of the  Low Beskids mountain range, lying north of the Dukla Pass and being named after the town of Dukla.

The range stretches from the valleys of the Wisłoka and  rivers in the west, to the Królik Polski - Daliowa - Czeremcha way in the east. Its boundary to the north is the Nowy Żmigród - Dukla way.

They are composed of sedimentary rocks - mainly sandstone, shales and conglomerates. Landslides are very common.

The highest peak is Baranie ("Ram's") (754 m).

Mountains of the Beskid Dukielski include (all measurements in metres above sea level):

 Cergowa (716 m)
 Kilanowska Góra (558 m)
 Chyrowa (695 m)
 Dania (696 m)
 Polana (651 m)
 Łysa Góra (641 m)
 Grzywacka Góra (567)
 Piotruś (728 m)
 Popowa Polana (638 m)
 Ostra (687 m)
  (754 m)
 Nad Tysowym (711 m)
 Żydowska Góra (719 m)
 Zimny Wierch (702 m)
 Czerteż (648 m)
 Dziurcz (586 m)

Bibliography
 Beskid Dukielski wyd. Rewasz, Pruszków 1999  (in Polish)
 Wojciech Krukar Rymanów Zdrój, Iwonicz-Zdrój i okolice. Mapa turystyczno-nazewnicza. wyd. Ruthenus, Krosno   (in Polish)

Mountain ranges of Poland
Mountain ranges of the Eastern Carpathians